John Pafford may refer to:

John Pafford (MP)
John Henry Pyle Pafford, librarian